Manot may refer to:

Manot, Charente, a commune in the Charente department of France
Manot, Israel, a moshav in northern Israel
Manot Cave, a site in Israel
Manot 1, the name of a skull of an anatomically-modern human found in Manot Cave